Suraj Singh may refer to:
 Suraj Singh (footballer)
 Suraj Singh (wrestler)

See also
 Suraj Singh Memorial College, a constituent college of Ranchi University in Ranchi, Jharkhand, India